Mahanagar Gas Limited (MGL) is an Indian natural gas distribution company, incorporated on 8 May 1995. MGL is an enterprise of GAIL (India) Limited (Maharatna Company of Government  of India) and Government of Maharashtra.

Operations

Mahanagar Gas presently supplies CNG to 0.77 million vehicles and piped natural gas to 1.53 million domestic households. Besides 3342 ST/ TMT / MSRTC / NMMT / PMPML buses, more than 6580 /Tempos/Trucks/Private buses are using CNG supplied through its wide distribution network. Consisting of about  steel and over  PE Pipeline over 250  CNG stations through 1268 dispensing points. Mahanagar Gas has also some petrol stations in Maharashtra. It is reported as one of the profitable companies in India.

Mahanagar Gas sources natural gas from a diversified base of suppliers for its domestic and industrial customers. Natural gas for domestic use is supplied by the Ministry of Petroleum and Natural Gas and GAIL under the administered price mechanism agreements while that for industrial and commercial use is sourced from the spot market or long term contracts.

References

Oil and gas companies of India
Natural gas companies
Utilities of India
Companies based in Mumbai
Energy companies established in 1995
Non-renewable resource companies established in 1995
Natural gas companies of India
1995 establishments in Maharashtra
Indian companies established in 1995
Companies listed on the National Stock Exchange of India
Companies listed on the Bombay Stock Exchange